Matteo Torchio (born 13 December 1983) is an Italian former bobsledder. He competed in the two man and the four man events at the 2006 Winter Olympics.

References

External links
 

1983 births
Living people
Italian male bobsledders
Olympic bobsledders of Italy
Bobsledders at the 2006 Winter Olympics
People from Asti
Sportspeople from the Province of Asti